Amrit Campus is the first science campus of Nepal, located in Lainchaur, Kathmandu. It was formerly known as Public Science College (PUSCOL.) It was later renamed in the memory of Amrit Prasad Pradhan. Pradhan was born in 1918 at Thamel, Kathmandu, Nepal. He worked as the headmaster of Juddhodaya Public High School in Birgunj for two years and later joined Tri-Chandra College as a lecturer in chemistry. In 1962, he became the founding principal of Public Science College and began teaching as a professor of chemistry.

Pradhan helped to establish Amrit Campus with a goal of promoting the study of science and technology in Nepal. The campus benefited greatly from his enterprise, dedication and enthusiasm. While on a mission to the United States for academic reasons, he died in an air crash over Mont Blanc on January 24, 1966.

Introduction
Amrit Campus (ASCOL), situated in the heart of Kathmandu Valley-Thamel, is one of the few pure science campus of the country. The campus is a governmental institution, with partial decentralization, affiliated to Tribhuvan University. This campus is one of the constituent campuses of Tribhuvan University. The number of students studying in ASCOL is nearly 1900.
 
It offers bachelors and masters level courses in physics, chemistry, mathematics, botany, zoology, statistics, computer science, environment science and microbiology. The courses offered by ASCOL are:
 Bachelor of Science in mathematics, statistics, physics, botany, zoology, chemistry, environmental science, and microbiology (general B.Sc.)
 Bachelor of Science in Computer Science and Information Technology
 Bachelor of Information Technology
 Master of Science in Mathematics
 Master of Science in Physics
 Master of Science in Chemistry
 Master of Science in Botany

Academic departments 
 Department of Mathematics
 Department of Chemistry
 Department of Physics
 Department of Statistics
 Department of Zoology
 Department of Botany
 Department of Microbiology
 Department of Environmental Science
 Department of Computer Science and Information Technology(CSIT)
 Department of English

Organizations

Common and free of all ideology 
 Tribhuvan University Teachers Association ASCOL Unit
 Tribhuvan University Bureaucratic Union ASCOL Unit
 Free Student Union

Organizations following political ideology

Teacher's Organization 
 Democratic Teacher's Union
 Progressive Teacher's Union
 Revolutionary national Teacher's union

Bureaucratic Union 
 Democratic Bureaucrats Union
 Progressive Bureaucrats Union
 Revolutionary Bureaucrates Union

Student organizations 
 ANNFSU
 Nepal Students' Union ASCOL Unit
 ANNISU(R) ASCOL Unit

Notable alumni

Notable alumni in the field of Science and technology 

 Prof. Dr. Bhanu Chandra Bajracharya -Mathematician, Former Chairperson of Department of Mathematics of ASCOL, Recipient of Third World Academy of Sciences Young Scientist Award - 1992
 Prof. Dr. Mana Raja Joshi - Mathematician
 (Late) Prof. Dr. Dayananda Bajracharya - Botanist, Former Chairman of Central Department of Botany, Former Rector of Tribhuvan University, Former President of Nepal Academy of Science and Technology (NAST) formerly called Royal Nepal Academy of Sciences (RONAST)
 Associate Professor Madan Sakya - Zoologist, Former Campus Chief of Amrit Science Campus
 Dr. Upendra Devkota 
 Dr. Madhav Prasad Baral - Chemist and Founder of NIST college
 Mr. Kulman Ghising - Managing Director, Nepal Electricity Authority
 Dr. Mahabir Pun - President of National Innovation, Leader of Nepal Wireless Project, Awardee: Ramon Magsaysay, Internet hall of fame, Ashoka Fellow, Scientist, Social entrepreneur

Notable alumni in other fields 
 Dr. Baburam Bhattarai (Former Prime minister of Nepal and former leader of UCPN (Maoist))
 Jhala Nath Khanal (Former Prime minister of Nepal and leader of CPN (UML))
 Kul Man Ghising (Managing Director of Nepal Electricity Authority (NEA))
 Prakash Man Singh (Deputy Prime minister of Nepal in the Cabinet led by Prime minister Sushil Koirala, General secretary of Nepali Congress)
 Dr. Minendra Prasad Rijal (Leader of Nepali Congress)
 Rukmangat Kattawal (Former Chief of Nepal Army)
 Kuber Singh Rana (Former IGP of Nepal Police)
 Amaresh Kumar Singh (Madhesi youth leader of Nepali Congress and Member of Parliament)
 Homraj Dahal (Former member of parliament of Nepal and leader of Nepali Congress)
 Pradip Paudel (Leader of Nepali Congress, Former President of Nepal Students' Union)

References

Schools in Nepal
Educational institutions established in 1962
1962 establishments in Nepal
Tribhuvan University
Ashoka Fellows